= Helena Saeed =

Helena Saeed (Urdu: حیلینہ سعید) is the first ever Pakistani female Additional Inspector General of police. She belongs to the Christian community and hails from Quetta, Balochistan, Pakistan.
